Zygaena escalerai  is a species of moth in the Zygaenidae family. It is found in Iran. In Seitz it is described - Z. escalerai Pouj. has orange spots on forewing, the external pairs being confluent; spot 6 is elongate and transverse. The hindwing is orange, with a vermilion tint, the disc being hyaline and the apex black, there being a black dot situated at centre of distal margin. The species has been discovered in Persia, the type contained in the Paris Museum being caught by Escalera [Manuel Martínez de la Escalera] in July. According to the description this form is allied to the fraxini-truchmena group.

References

External links
Images representing Zygaena escalerai at Bold

Moths described in 1900
Zygaena